Pavol Dobšinský (16 March 1828 – 22 October 1885) was a Slovak collector of folklore and writer belonging to the period of Romanticism and the Štúr generation. He is perhaps best known for creating the largest and most complete collection of Slovak folktales, Prostonárodnie slovenské povesti (Simple National Slovak Tales), self-published in a series of eight books from 1880 to 1883.

Works
The focus of most of his work was on folklore. He first published a collection of Slovak tales in Slovenské povesti (Slovak Tales) from 1858 to 1861 in 6 volumes, with a total of 64 stories. He followed this up with Prostonárodnie obyčaje, povery a hry slovenské (Simple National Slovak Customs, Superstitions, and Plays) in 1880, just five years before his death. In that same year, he also started publishing a series of volumes at his own expense of a more complete and larger collection of Slovak folktales, Prostonárodnie slovenské povesti (Simple National Slovak Tales). He would continue publishing more volumes of this work until 1883, bringing the total up to 90 stories in 8 volumes. As most of the folk and fairy tales were originally intended for an adult audience, Dobšinský had to edit out much brutality, eroticism and juicy humor, thus making them suitable for children and simultaneously helping them to be more popular.

These works are still considered to be essential and representative collections of Slovak folklore, while they have been rewritten a number of times, too, and they have also been published in more than twenty-one countries. To this day, they remain one of the most popular Slovak books ever written.

Works online 
 DOBŠINSKÝ, P., ŠKULTÉTY, A. H. Slovenské povesti Kniha 1. Povesti prastarých báječných časov. Rožňava: [s.n.], 1858. 401 p. - available at ULB´s Digital Library

Further reading
 Cooper, David L. 2004. “Myth, Motif, and Motivation: Pavol Dobšinský’s Theory and Practice of the Wondertale”. In: FOLKLORICA - Journal of the Slavic, East European, and Eurasian Folklore Association 9 (2): 6-13. https://doi.org/10.17161/folklorica.v9i2.3749.

Slovak poets
Slovak writers
Slovak Protestants
1828 births
1885 deaths
People from Rožňava District